Saturdays in Silesia was a 1982 single from Rational Youth, a Canadian new wave band. It was probably the band's greatest hit.

The song had also been adapted for the Commodore 64 sound demo Synth Sample 1.

See also
Silesia

Canadian pop songs
1982 singles
1982 songs